DelVaughn Alexander (born July 16, 1971) is an American football coach and former player.

College career
Alexander played college football at the University of Southern California where he backed up Johnnie Morton and Keyshawn Johnson. Prior to USC, Alexander went to West Los Angeles College.

Coaching career
Between 1995 and 1997, Alexander was a graduate assistant coach for the USC Trojans. Alexander was the wide receivers coach for the University of Notre Dame. Prior to that, he coached at Arizona State University, University of Wisconsin–Madison, University of San Diego, Oregon State University and the University of Nevada, Las Vegas (UNLV). He also worked for the National Football League's San Diego Chargers. In the spring of 2022, Alexander was hired as the wide receivers coach at Georgia Tech.

References

External links
 Georgia Tech profile
 Arizona State profile

1971 births
Living people
American football wide receivers
Arizona State Sun Devils football coaches
Georgia Tech Yellow Jackets football coaches
Notre Dame Fighting Irish football coaches
Oregon State Beavers football coaches
San Diego Chargers coaches
San Diego Toreros football coaches
UNLV Rebels football coaches
USC Trojans football coaches
USC Trojans football players
Wisconsin Badgers football coaches
West Los Angeles Wildcats football players
Coaches of American football from California
Players of American football from Los Angeles
Sports coaches from Los Angeles
African-American coaches of American football
African-American players of American football
21st-century African-American sportspeople
20th-century African-American people